Ashley Grace may refer to:
 Ashley Grace, a member of the music duo Ha*Ash
 Ashley Grace, also known as Ashley Hinshaw, an American actress and model
 Ashley Grace Twichell, American swimmer